Bisnow, is a multi-platform digital media media company serving the commercial real estate industry through news, events, recruiting, executive retreats, and marketing services. Founded in 2005, Bisnow is owned by private equity firm Wicks Group and has more than 150 full-time employees. Bisnow covers more than 40 metropolitan markets across the U.S., Canada and the U.K. with a subscriber base of over 1,500,000 and hosting 350 events a year. The company's publications and news have won more than 30 international journalism awards, including gold  and silver awards.

History
Bisnow was founded in 2005 by Mark Bisnow, a Washington D.C. lawyer, business executive, and radio talk show host, who had become known for irreverent "Bisnow on Business" radio spots on a D.C.-area all-news station, and he was active in local business organizations and philanthropies. Bisnow is quoted as saying he wanted to build “the Starbucks of electronic newsletters.” 

Mark Bisnow was named chairman when he turned over the CEO position to Ryan Begelman, previously the COO of Bisnow and also co-founder of Summit Series. Will Friend was named CEO of Bisnow in January 2015. In July 2022, . Chief Financial Officer Gregg Mayer took over as CEO.

In 2012, Bisnow launched "Escape", an executive multi-day retreat for commercial real estate owners, developers, and financiers focused on direct deal generation. This executive retreat was joined by Ascent, focused on executives looking for dealmaking opportunities and to connect with other leaders on the rise.. In 2023, Bisnow launched Elevate, a retreat for investment leaders looking to grow their networks and skillsets. 

In May 2016, Bisnow Media was acquired by Wicks Group, a private equity firm based in New York, for an estimated $50 million.

In late 2019, Bisnow acquired SelectLeaders, a job board focused on the commercial real estate industry. In 2021, Bisnow launched executive search services to its suite of recruitment services. The SelectLeaders platform works with more than 315,000 candidates and 5,000 employers across the industry and focuses on specialized service to fill open roles in the industry.

Operations
Bisnow produces email newsletters highlighting news and information for commercial real estate professionals. As of early 2023, the company distributes its newsletters and email briefs to more than 1.5 million subscribers. The company also produces events, hosting more than 350 events in 40 markets all focused on the commercial real estate industry.

In 2021, Bisnow received 10 National Association of Real Estate Editors' Journalism Awards, including recognition of the publication’s coverage on the lack of progress in commercial real estate’s efforts to diversify the industry following the Black Lives Matter movement. As of 2023, the editorial team has taken home more than 30 international journalism awards.

References

External links
 Official website

Newsletter publishing companies
Business newspapers published in the United States
American financial news websites